Bangalee, Queensland may refer to:

 Bangalee, Queensland (Gladstone Region), a township within the locality of Tannum Sands
 Bangalee, Queensland (Livingstone Shire), a locality on the Capricorn Coast